Independent Municipal Democracy (in Spanish: Democracia Municipal Independiente) was a political party in Najera, La Rioja, Spain. DMI contested the 1979 municipal elections, in which it won 350 votes (13%). One DMI candidate was elected to the municipal council, Clemente Gasco Aldonza.

Political parties in La Rioja (Spain)